The Sayan Mountains ( Sajany; , Soyonï nurû) are a mountain range in southern Siberia, Russia (Buryatia, Irkutsk Oblast, Krasnoyarsk Krai, Tuva Republic and Khakassia) and northern Mongolia. In the past, it served as the border between Mongolia and Russia.

The Sayan Mountains' towering peaks and cool lakes southwest of Tuva give rise to the tributaries that merge to become one of Siberia's major rivers, the Yenisei River, which flows north over 3,400 kilometres (2000 mi) to the Arctic Ocean. This is a protected and isolated area, having been kept closed by the Soviet Union since 1944.

Geography

Western Sayan
At 92°E the Western Sayan system is pierced by the Ulug-Khem or Upper Yenisei River, and at 106°, at its eastern extremity, it terminates above the depression of the Selenga-Orkhon Valley. From the Mongolian plateau the ascent is on the whole gentle, but from the plains of Siberia it is much steeper. The range includes a number of subsidiary ranges of an Alpine character, such as the Aradan, Borus, Oy, Kulumys, Mirsky, Kurtushibin, Uyuk, Sheshpir-Taiga, Ergak-Targak-Taiga, Kedran and Nazarovsky ranges. The most important peaks are Kyzlasov Peak, Aradansky Peak, Bedelig Golets, Samzhir, Borus and Zvezdny Peak.

Between the breach of the Yenisei and Lake Khövsgöl at 100° 30' E. the system bears also the name of Yerghik-Taiga.  The flora is on the whole poor, although the higher regions carry good forests of larch, pine, juniper, birch, and alder, with rhododendrons and species of Berberis and Ribes.  Lichens and mosses clothe many of the boulders that are scattered over the upper slopes.

Eastern Sayan
Some subranges of the northwest form a system of "White Mountains" (Белогорье) or "Belki", such as Manskoye Belogorye, Kanskoye Belogorye, Kuturchinskoye Belogorye, as well as Agul Belki (Агульские Белки), with permanent snow on the peaks.

To the southeast rise the highest and most remote subranges, including the Bolshoy Sayan and Kropotkin Range, as well as "Goltsy" type of mountains, such as the Tunka Goltsy, Kitoy Goltsy, Botogolsky Goltsy, among others. The mountains of the Eastern Sayan characteristically display alpine relief forms. In general, rivers flowing down from the ranges form gorges and there is an abundance of waterfalls in the area.

The Ice Age Period 

In this area that currently shows only small cirque glaciers, at glacial times glaciers have flowed down from the 3492 m high Munku Sardyk massif situated west of Lake Baikal and from the 12.100 km2 extended completely glaciated granite-gneiss plateau (2300 m asl) of the East-Sayan mountains as well as the east-connected 2600 – 3110 m-high summits in the Tunkinskaya Dolina valley, joining to a c. 30 km-wide parent glacier. Its glacier tongue that flowed down to the east, to Lake Baikal, came to an end at 500 m asl (51°48’28.98"N/103°0’29.86"E). The Khamar Daban mountains were covered by a large-scale ice cap filling up the valley relief. 

From its valley heads, e.g. the upper Slujanka valley (51°32’N/103°37’E), but also through parallel valleys like the Snirsdaja valley, outlet glaciers flowed to the north to Lake Baikal. The Snirsdaja-valley-outlet glacier has calved, among other outlet glaciers, at c. 400 m asl into Lake Baikal (51°27’N/104°51’E). The glacial (Würm ice age = Last Glacial Period = MIS 2) glacier snowline (ELA) as altitude limit between glacier feeding area and ablation zone has run in these mountains between 1450 and 1250 m asl. This corresponds to a snowline depression of 1500 m against the current height of the snowline. Under the condition of a comparable precipitation ratio there might result from this a glacial depression of the average annual temperature of 7.5 to 9 °C for the Last Ice Age against today.

Origins of reindeer husbandry

According to Sev’yan I. Vainshtein, Sayan reindeer herding, as historically practiced by the Evenks, is "the oldest form of reindeer herding and is associated with the earliest domestication of the reindeer by the Samoyedic taiga population of the Sayan Mountains at the turn of the first millennium A.D."

The Sayan region was apparently the origin of the economic and cultural complex of reindeer hunters-herdsmen that we now see among the various Evenki groups and the peoples of the Sayan area.

The ancestors of modern Evenki groups inhabited areas adjacent to the Sayan Mountains, and it is highly likely that they took part in the process of reindeer domestication along with the Samoyedic population." The local indigenous groups that have retained their traditional lifestyle nowadays live almost exclusively in the area of the Eastern Sayan mountains. However, the local reindeer herding communities were greatly affected by russification and sovietization, with many Evenks losing their traditional lifestyle and groups like the Mator and Kamas peoples being assimilated altogether.

According to Juha Janhunen, and other linguists, the homeland of the Uralic languages is located in South-Central Siberia in the Sayan Mountains region. Meanwhile, Turkologist Peter Benjamin Golden locates the Proto-Turkic Urheimat in the southern taiga-steppe zone of the Sayan-Altay region. Alternatively, the Proto-Uralic homeland is located farther westwards (e.g. in the Volga-Kama region) while the Proto-Turkic homeland is located farther eastwards (e.g. "in the southern fringe of the [Northern Eurasian Greenbelt] in Northeast Asia ... near eastern Mongolia").

Science

The Sayan Solar Observatory is located in these mountains at an altitude of 2,000 meters.

See also 
 Abakan River
 Ergaki
 Geography of South-Central Siberia
 Lykov family
 Mana River
 Minusinsk Depression
 Tuva Depression
 Altai-Sayan region

Notes

External links

Tuva -Sayan Mountains
Photo of Sayan Mountains
Valley of Volcanoes (in Russian)

 
Mountain ranges of Russia
Mountain ranges of Mongolia
Landforms of Buryatia